Eden's Landing railway station is located on the Beenleigh line in Queensland, Australia. It serves the suburb of Eden's Landing in Logan City. On 21 April 1992, a second platform opened as part of the duplication of the line.

Services
Eden's Landing is served by all stops Beenleigh line services from Beenleigh to Bowen Hills and Ferny Grove.

Services by platform

References

External links

Eden's Landing station Queensland's Railways on the Internet
[ Eden's Landing station] TransLink travel information

Logan City
Railway stations in Logan City